The Electronic Engineering Polytechnic Institute of Surabaya (EEPIS) ( (PENS)) is a technical institution located in Indonesia. It serves its community by conducting research to resolve industrial and community problems.

History
The institute was founded with the support and assistance of the Japan International Cooperation Agency (JICA), who sent a team in 1985 to assess the need for aid. Lead by Prof. Y. Naito from Tokyo Institute of Technology, the team conducted an initial assessment to the area that resulting agreement for the development of the campus.

In 1987, construction of the institution began. Japan also provided training for EEPIS instructors, both before and after the opening of the school, in Indonesia and Japan. It was officially inaugurated on June 2, 1988, by the Indonesian president Suharto.

Since its inception, the institution has held several names. When it opened, it was the Politeknik Elektronika & Telekomunikasi. From 1992 to 1991 it was entitled Politeknik Elektronika Surabaya, at which time it came under the umbrella of Institut Teknologi Sepuluh Nopember. In 1996, it was retitled to Politeknik Elektronika Negeri Surabaya (PENS).

After 24 years under the statute of Institut Teknologi Sepuluh Nopember, the institution is no longer a part of ITS. The transition year was 2012. Since then, EEPIS is independently separated from ITS and started to stand on its own statute.

Education 
As a technical educational institution in the field of applied science, PENS has a long-term vision to provide education platform in the field of emerging technologies by conducting research and innovation to the society.

To diverse technical education, EEPIS in cooperation with many local governments in East Java established Community College as an embryo of vocational education in their district. The cooperation begins in the 2002 and the teaching took place in local vocational high school (SMK). In 2014, more than 1500 graduates are supplied by this schema.

Degrees
EEPIS offers two degrees, Diploma-III is a three-year degree course, while Diploma-IV is a four-year course. The Diploma-III graduates will hold associate degree and Diploma-IV graduates will be granted with bachelor of applied science (B.A.Sc).

In 2016, EEPIS has signed an MoU with GMF AeroAsia to provide a specialized vocational education for the company to fulfill the necessity of skilled graduates with Aircraft Maintenance Training Standard (AMTO) certificate. The graduates will be directly contracted by GMF AeroAsia as a professional worker. In the same year, PLN, an Indonesian government-owned corporation also signed same MoU with mutual schema.

The departments that the institution offers are:

Diploma III:
Electronics Engineering
Telecommunications Engineering
Industrial Electrical Engineering
Informatics Engineering
Multimedia Broadcasting

Diploma IV:
Electronics Engineering
Telecommunications Engineering
Industrial Electrical Engineering
Informatics Engineering
Mechatronics Engineering
Computer Engineering
 Power Generation System
 Game Technology

Campus
The EEPIS building is located on the campus of Institut Teknologi Sepuluh Nopember. It includes labs as well as classrooms, workshops, offices and student dormitories. It also includes a canteen, libraries and mosques. Mojokerto local district signed a Memorandum of Understanding with EEPIS to expand the main campus to their area in 2017. It is hoped that within this agreement, local society will be able to access higher education easier.

References

External links
Official site
Lecturer
Informatics
Electronics
Mechatronics

Colleges in Indonesia
Universities in East Java
Educational institutions in Surabaya
Japan International Cooperation Agency